Patzkea is a genus of plants in the grass family.

Its native to Europe and Africa. It is found in Europe within Albania, Austria, Bulgaria, France, Greece, Italy, Portugal, Romania, Sicily, Spain, Switzerland and Yugoslavia. In Africa it is found in Algeria, Morocco and Tunisia.

The genus name of Patzkea is in honour of Erwin Patzke (1929–2018), German botanist and professor, specialist in grasses. 
It was first described and published in Jahrb. Bochum. Bot. Vereins Vol.1 on page 126 in 2010.

Known species
According to Kew;
 Patzkea coerulescens 
 Patzkea durandoi 
 Patzkea paniculata 
 Patzkea patula

References

External links 
 Grassbase - The World Online Grass Flora

Poaceae genera
Plants described in 2010
Pooideae